The 2006–07 Irish Premier League was the fourth season of Northern Ireland's national football league in this format since its inception in 2003, and the 106th season of Irish league football overall.

The season began on 23 September 2006, and ended on 28 April 2007. Linfield was the defending champion, and successfully defended the title by 8 points to become champions for the 47th time. Loughgall was relegated after finishing bottom of the table, while Glenavon survived after beating Bangor 4–2 on penalties in the promotion play-off following a 1–1 draw on aggregate after extra time in the second leg.

League table

Results
Each team played every other team twice (home and away) for a total of 30 games.

Promotion/relegation play-off
Glenavon, the club that finished in the relegation play-off place, faced Bangor, the runners-up of the 2006-07 Intermediate League First Division in a two-legged tie for a place in next season's Irish Premier League.

Glenavon won the tie 4–2 on penalties after a 1-1 aggregate draw and retained their Premiership status.

1-1 on aggregate. Glenavon won 4–2 on penalties and remained in the Irish Premier League

References

External links
 Irish Football Club Project
 Soccerway
rsssf

NIFL Premiership seasons
1
Northern